Hebei Daily is the official newspaper of the Hebei branch of the Chinese Communist Party (CCP).

History and profile
Hebei Daily was established in 1949. It is edited in the provincial capital Shijiazhuang and printed in 11 cities every morning. This newspaper is broadsheet, often with 16 pages. Its report is focused on daily activities of Provincial Communist Leaders (such as Provincial Party Secretary Bai Keming) and the social and economic development of the province.

As a newspaper mainly for propaganda purposes, it is circulated in the government departments, state-owned companies, and military units.

Its publisher is Hebei Daily Newspaper Group, which owns Yanzhao Metropolis Daily, a tabloid.

References

External links
Internet edition of Hebei Daily

Communist newspapers
Chinese-language newspapers (Simplified Chinese)
Mass media in Hebei
Mass media in Shijiazhuang
Daily newspapers published in China
Newspapers established in 1949
1949 establishments in China
Chinese Communist Party newspapers